Giuseppe Patanè (1 January 1932 – 29 May 1989) was an Italian opera conductor.

He was born in Naples, the son of the conductor Franco Patanè (1908–1968), and studied in his native city. He made his debut there in 1951. He was principal conductor at the Linz opera in 1961–62. He subsequently was chief conductor of the Munich Radio Orchestra from 1985 to 1989.

Patanè collapsed suddenly from a heart attack while conducting a performance of Il barbiere di Siviglia at the Bavarian State Opera in Munich, on 29 May 1989. He was taken to hospital where he died. He and his wife Rita, from whom he was separated at the time of his death, had two daughters.

Discography 

 1986 Umberto Giordano: Fedora – CBS Records
 1987 Giacomo Puccini: Il tabarro – Eurodisc
 1987 Giordano: Andrea Chénier – CBS Records
 1988 Puccini: Gianni Schicchi – Eurodisc
 1988 Puccini: Suor Angelica – Eurodisc
 1993 Gaetano Donizetti: Lucia di Lammermoor (highlights) – Corona Classic Collection
 1993 Gioachino Rossini: Il barbiere di Siviglia London
 1993 Giuseppe Verdi: La forza del destino (excerpts) – Berlin Classics
 1993 Verdi: La traviata – Orfeo
 1993 Verdi: La traviata (highlights) – Berlin Classics
 1995 Donizetti: Lucia di Lammermoor – Curb
 1996 Verdi: Simon Boccanegra – Hungaroton
 1998 Verdi: Aida (in German) – Berlin Classics
 1998 Georges Bizet: Carmen (excerpts in German) – Berlin Classics
 1998 Verdi: La forza del destino – Myto Records
 2001 Verdi: Don Carlos (excerpts in German) – EMI Music Distribution
 2003 Donizetti: Maria Stuarda – Philips
 2004 Pietro Mascagni: Iris
 2005 Vincenzo Bellini: I Capuleti e i Montecchi – Gala Records
 Bellini: I Capuleti e i Montecchi – EMI Music Distribution
 Amilcare Ponchielli: La Gioconda – Myto Records
 Puccini: Madama Butterfly – Hungaroton
 Verdi: Un ballo in maschera – GAO
 Verdi: La traviata – Madacy
 Verdi: Messa da Requiem – Berlin Classics

References

Italian male conductors (music)
1932 births
1989 deaths
Musicians from Naples
Conductors (music) who died while conducting
20th-century Italian conductors (music)
20th-century Italian male musicians
Bayerischer Rundfunk people